Charaki is a small fishing village on the east coast of the island of Rhodes, Greece. In addition to its fishing trade, Charaki is also a small holiday resort, with the usual tavernas, restaurants and bars.  Charaki has a small, picturesque bay with a number of holiday apartments in addition to its tavernas.  More recently, the land behind the bay has been host to a small number of housing developments.

Charaki is only half an hour drive from Rhodes International Airport, and 10 minutes drive from the town of Lindos.

On the acropolis overlooking Charaki is Feraclos Castle (aka Feraklos) (Greek Φεράκλος) - Feraclos was built by the Knights of St John, and was the last stronghold in Rhodes to succumb to the Ottoman Empire. From the Feraclos castle, there is a panoramic view of Charaki, the sandy beach of Agia Agathi, and more far to the south the town of Lindos.

Wild mountain sheep and moufflon inhabit the village's surrounding mountains.  Generally, the animals congregate in the castle at dusk and remain there until sunrise.

Most inhabitants of Charaki are residents of the nearby agricultural village Malona.

Visible from Charaki bay is the acropolis of Lindos, the next major town to the village.

Situated on a similar half-moon bay, Charaki is slightly smaller than the Greek village of Stoupa near Kalamata on the Greek mainland.

Charaki was rated as one of the cleanest beaches of the Greek isles in 2022.

References

Gallery 

Fishing communities
Populated places in Rhodes